Hilton Poulier (1909 – 6 May 1979) was a cricketer who played on Ceylon's first tour in 1932–33.

He attended Royal College, Colombo, and played for Burgher Recreation Club in Colombo as a right-arm fast-medium bowler and useful lower-order batsman. On his first-class debut, for Dr J. Rockwood's Ceylon XI in December 1929, he took 5 for 17 and 3 for 29 in the victory over J. D. Antia's Bombay XI in Colombo.

He took part in Ceylon's tour of India in 1932-33, when he was the team's main pace bowler, taking 14 wickets at an average of 24.21 in the five first-class matches. Reporting on the tour in The Cricketer, the Indian journalist I. M. Mansukhani noted that "Poulier was their fast bowler, but his length was imperfect". He took five wickets and top-scored in the second innings with 53 not out – batting at number 10 – when Ceylon beat Central Provinces and Berar.

He lost the middle finger of his right hand as the result of an accident at work for the Harbour Engineer's Department in 1937. He was never quite the same player afterwards.

References

External links

1909 births
1979 deaths
Sri Lankan cricketers
All-Ceylon cricketers
Alumni of Royal College, Colombo
Burgher Recreation Club cricketers